A serjeant-at-arms, or sergeant-at-arms, is an officer appointed by a deliberative body, usually a legislature, to keep order during its meetings. The word "serjeant" is derived from the Latin serviens, which means "servant". Historically, serjeants-at-arms were armed men retained by English lords and monarchs, and the ceremonial maces which they are associated with were originally a type of weapon.

Origins
The term "sergeant" can be given two main definitions; the first being a military rank and the other a governmental role. Whereas technically the two roles were not mutually exclusive, they were very different in roles and duties. The soldier sergeant was a man of what would now be thought of as the 'middle class', fulfilling a junior role to the knight in the medieval hierarchy. Sergeants could fight either as heavy to light cavalry, or as well-trained professional infantry, either spearmen or crossbowmen. Most notable medieval mercenaries fell into the 'sergeant' class, such as Flemish crossbowmen and spearmen, who were seen as reliable quality troops. The sergeant class were deemed to be 'worth half of a knight' in military value. The office originated in medieval England to serve the sovereign in a police role, much like a bailiff in more recent times. Indeed, the sergeants-at-arms constitute the oldest royal bodyguard in England, dating from the time of King Richard I (around 1189) as a formed body. The title "sergeant-at-arms" appears during the crusades during the reign of King Philip II of France in 1192.

The sergeant-at-arms was a personal attendant upon the king, specially charged with arresting those suspected of treason. Richard I had 24 with him on the Crusades. They were formed into a twenty-strong Corps of Sergeants-at-Arms by King Edward I in 1278, as a mounted close escort. In 1399 King Richard II limited the corps to thirty sergeants, and King Charles II had sixteen. The number was reduced to eight in 1685 and since then it has gradually declined.

The original responsibilities of the sergeant-at-arms included "collecting loans and, impressing men and ships, serving on local administration and in all sorts of ways interfering with local administration and justice." Around 1415, the British House of Commons received its first sergeant-at-arms. From that time onwards the sergeant has been a royal appointment, the sergeant being one of the sovereign's sergeants-at-arms. The House of Lords has a similar officer.

The formal role of a sergeant-at-arms in modern legislative bodies is to keep order during meetings, and, if necessary, forcibly remove any members or guests who are overly rowdy or disruptive. A sergeant-at-arms may thus be a retired soldier, police officer, or other official with experience in law enforcement and security. The Sergeant-at-Arms of the House of Commons has general charge of certain administrative and custodial functions, as well as security within the chamber of the House.

Specific countries

Australia
The Australian House of Representatives operates under the Westminster parliamentary system. The serjeant-at-arms is a career officer of the Department of the House of Representatives. The ceremonial duties are as the custodian of the mace, the symbol of the authority of the Crown and the House, and as the messenger for formal messages from the House to the Senate. The serjeant has the authority to remove disorderly people, by force if necessary, from the House or the public or press galleries on the instructions of the speaker. The administrative duties of the serjeant include allocation of office accommodation, furniture and fittings for members' offices, coordination of car transport for members, mail and courier services for the House, security for the House and arrangements for school visits. Once a meeting has started in a House the serjeant will usually stand at the door to keep authority and make sure no one else comes in or out.

Bangladesh
The serjeant-at-arms is the senior official of the National Parliament (Jatiyo Sangshad) who is responsible for maintaining order during sessions and to maintain security and protocol at Parliament under the guidance of the speaker. Presently, Captain M M Naim Rahman (G), NGP, NCC, PSC, BN naval officer, is appointed as serjeant-at-arms.

Canada

The sergeant-at-arms is the senior official of the House of Commons of Canada. In this role, the sergeant-at-arms is responsible for the building services and security of the House of Commons, and is appointed by the governor general acting on the advice of the federal cabinet. The sergeant-at-arms carries the mace, the symbol of the authority of the Crown, in the daily parade into the House of Commons chamber.

Provincial legislative assemblies, houses of assembly, national assemblies, and provincial parliaments (the nomenclature for legislatures varying between provinces) also employ sergeants-at-arms.

René Jalbert, sergeant-at-arms of the National Assembly of Quebec, ended Denis Lortie's killing spree in the Quebec Parliament Building on 8 May 1984 by constituting himself hostage and negotiating with the shooter for four hours.

During the 2014 shootings at Parliament Hill, Ottawa, the then sergeant-at-arms of the House of Commons, Kevin M. Vickers, assisted RCMP officers in engaging the gunman. Reports show that Sergeant-at-Arms Vickers, alongside RCMP Constable Curtis Barrett, shot and killed the gunman who had gained access to the Centre Block of the Canadian Parliament buildings.

Liberia

In addition to the president pro tempore, the Senate of Liberia elects a secretary of the Senate, assistant secretary of the Senate and a sergeant-at-arms as officers of the Senate, though these positions are not held by sitting senators.

New Zealand

The New Zealand House of Representatives operates under the Westminster parliamentary system. 
 
The current serjeant-at-arms is Captain Steve Streefkerk, RNZN (Rtd), a permanent officer of the House supported by the Chamber and Meeting Support Team.

The serjeant-at-arms controls officials and members staff coming to the House, and the surrounding areas such as the lobbies and the members lounge. There is involvement at select committees where the chairman seeks assistance to maintain good order. The serjeant-at-arms sits in the debating chamber opposite the speaker at the visitors door for each House sitting session to ensure that security is effective, good order is maintained, administers the Members Attendance Register and takes instructions from the speaker or the other presiding officers - deputy speaker or two assistant speakers, when they are presiding.

The chamber and meeting support officers control all access to the House, and attend to the needs of the members of parliaments, and officials when the House is undertaking its business.

The gallery operation for visitors or strangers is controlled by the Parliamentary Service Security Service, but the speaker and the serjeant-at-arms have the overall authority as defined in Standing Orders.

Past serjeants-at-arms in recent times have been Group Captain Manson (who in May 1965 was promoted to Usher of the Black Rod), Wing Commander Bob McKay, Ms Ipi Cross, Ms Carol Rankin, Mr Donald Cameron, Mr Fred Hutton and Mr Brent Smith.

South Africa
The serjeant-at-arms is a member of the parliamentary staff who acts as the official guardian of the mace, a decorated rod which is the symbol of the authority of the Parliament of South Africa. The mace must be in position in the National Assembly chamber during a plenary sitting.

The serjeant-at-arms is also responsible for maintaining the attendance register of the members of House members. They must also maintain order in the House and remove people from the House as ordered by the speaker.

According to the National Assembly Rules, "the Serjeant-at-Arms shall remove, or cause to be removed, any stranger from any part of a Chamber which has been set apart for members only, and also any stranger who, having been admitted into any other part of the Chamber, misconducts himself or herself or does not withdraw when strangers are ordered to withdraw."

The serjeant-at-arms is attired in a black tailcoat, waistcoat, starched white shirt, bow tie, and white gloves. The current serjeant-at-arms is Regina Mhlomi, who succeeded Godfrey Cleinwerck. The usher of the black rod is Vincent Shabalala, whose duty it is to escort the presiding officers of the National Council of Provinces into its chamber.

Sri Lanka

The Parliament of Sri Lanka was established in the form of the Westminster parliamentary system. The serjeant-at-arms is appointed by the secretary general of Parliament and is responsible for all ceremonial occasions as the master of ceremonies in Parliament, preservation of order, custody of the mace, security, admission of visitors, allocation of accommodation within the House and supervision of galleries. Assisting the serjeant-at-arms in his duties would be the deputy serjeant-at-arms and the assistant serjeant-at-arms.

Responsible for security, by tradition he is the only officer authorized to carry a weapon (ceremonial sword) inside the Parliament building and is assisted by the Parliament Police Division. Admission of visitors to the precincts of Parliament is controlled by the serjeant-at-arms. The serjeant-at-arms and assistant serjeant-at-arms would wear a white uniform with medal ribbons during normal sittings of parliament. On ceremonial occasions they would wear a uniform similar to a No. 1 Dress uniform of a major general in the Sri Lanka Army, with varied gorget patchs and epaulette similar to a flag officer of the Sri Lanka Navy

During the normal sitting days of the House, the serjeant-at-arms wears a white colour uniform and on ceremonial occasions is clad with specially designed black colour ceremonial attire.  (equivalent to the rank of the major-general)

The first serjeant-at-arms of Parliament was M. Ismail MBE, who was appointed in 1947. Ronnie Abeysinghe was the longest serving serjeant-at-arms in the history of Sri Lanka. He held the position from 1970 to 1996. The current serjeant-at-arms is Anil P. Samarasekara.

United Kingdom

Parliament

The serjeant-at-arms of the House of Commons is responsible for security matters concerning the House of Commons. The serjeant, whilst in the Commons overseeing proceedings, can also escort members of parliament out of the chamber by order of the speaker of the House. The post dates back to 1415, and has often been held by retired military or police figures (though in recent years those from a civil service background have been appointed). The current serjeant-at-arms is Ugbana Oyet (appointed in October 2019); he was previously an electrical engineer in Parliament.

The equivalent officer for the House of Lords is the Gentleman Usher of the Black Rod (also known simply as Black Rod); there was formerly a separate serjeant-at-arms of the House of Lords, but the two appointments were merged in 1971 (since when the mace has routinely been carried by Black Rod's deputy, the Yeoman Usher).

The Royal Household 

In addition to the above-mentioned officers there are other serjeants-at-arms who attend the sovereign on state occasions, a remnant of the body established by Richard I (though today their role is purely ceremonial). Usually, members of the Royal Household who serve as serjeants-at-arms have had the office bestowed on them as a mark of distinction for long and meritorious service.

Insignia
The mace serves as a symbol of royal and parliamentary authority. Ten maces are kept in the Jewel House at the Tower of London in addition to those kept by the House of Commons, the House of Lords and the Lord Chancellor. As well as carrying their maces, on state occasions each serjeant-at-arms wears a collar of esses as a symbol of his or her office. As a testament to the symbolic power of the insignia, when the Republic of Ireland declared independence from the United Kingdom at the First Dáil in 1919, one of the first decisions declared was that there was to be "no robes, no mace, no velveted sergeant-at-arms".

United States

The two houses of the United States Congress maintain the position of sergeant-at-arms. The sergeants are charged with the maintenance of order on the floor of the chamber (in the House, he may "display" the mace in front of an unruly member as an admonition to behave); they serve with the Architect of the Capitol on the commission that oversees the United States Capitol Police and security for the Congress, and they serve a variety of other functional and ceremonial roles.

Other bodies
Other bodies—from state and local legislative houses (city councils, county legislatures and the like) to civic and social organizations—have created posts of sergeants-at-arms, primarily to enforce order at the direction of the chair and to assist in practical details of organizing meetings. Other duties may include the greeting of visitors or providing security. The sergeant-at-arms may be in charge of the organization's property.

The title is also used in criminal motorcycle clubs like Hells Angels.

In large organizations, the sergeant-at-arms may have assistants.

A law enforcement officer may serve in the role of sergeant-at-arms or it may be a paid (or unpaid), permanent position in the organization.

Notes

References

External links
 

Westminster system
British ceremonial units
Bodyguards
Positions within the British Royal Household
Serjeants-at-Arms of the House of Commons of England